Rosa "Rosita" Arenas (born 19 August 1933) is a Mexican actress whose film career was most prominent during the 1950s and 1960s. She is one of the last divas of Golden Age of Mexican cinema.

She was born in Caracas, Venezuela, the daughter of Spanish actor Miguel Arenas. At age 16, she was named Reina de la Primavera (Queen of the Spring), and subsequently made her film debut in Anacleto se divorcia (1950). She received more important roles in ¡¿Qué te ha dado esa mujer?! (1951), with Pedro Infante and Luis Aguilar, and El señor fotógrafo (1953), with Cantinflas. She also tried her hand at singing; in Los chiflados del rock and roll (1957), she sang the songs "Se me hizo fácil", "Serenata huasteca", and "Qué manera de perder".

Selected filmography
 Your Memory and Me (1953)
 The Plebeian (1953)
 The Photographer (1953)
 Night and Dawn (1958)

References

External links

1933 births
Living people
20th-century Mexican actresses
Mexican women singers
Actresses from Caracas